Miss Universe Cambodia 2022 was the 4th edition of the Miss Universe Cambodia pageant which will be held on June 15, 2022, in Phnom Penh. Miss Universe Cambodia 2021 Ngin Marady crowned Manita Hang as her successor at the end of the event.

Background

Location and date
The fourth edition of the Miss Universe Cambodia beauty contest was scheduled to be held on 15 June 2022. The press conference of the contest was conducted at the Oakwood Premier in Phnom Penh on 30 April, in which the Bayon TV Steung Meanchey Studio in Phnom Penh will be served as the venue for the national costume parade, preliminary competition and the grand final coronation whereas R&F City Swimming Pool of R&F City Phnom Penh will be served as the venue for the swimsuit competition.

Hosts and Performer
Like the 2021 edition, Try Davaruth (Cambodia's Man of the Year 2019) hosted the preliminary competition with the reigning Miss Universe Cambodia (Ngin Marady) to host the preliminary competition as well as Somnang Alyna hosting as well. As for the final however, instead of Somnang Alyna, Na sady and Sarita Reth (Miss Universe Cambodia 2020 and official mentor of Miss Universe Cambodia) hosted the event with Try Davaruth.

Selection of Participants
Applications for Miss Universe Cambodia started on 1st April 2022 and the official press presentation for Miss Universe Cambodia 2022 was on 20th May 2022.

'Queen Indradevi' Crown
A new crown will be used to award the winner of the Miss Universe Cambodia pageant for the 2022 edition. The headwear is known as the "Queen Indradevi" crown and was crafted by CSNJ Samnang Jewellery. The crown costs USD $180,000 (KHR 736,394,760 ៛)

The crown was inspired from the headwear of Queen Indradevi, wife of Jayavarman VII. It is said to be designed to follow the greatness of Queen Indradevi’s Crown, which shows power and prestige of Khmer women from the past and the present.

Results 
Color keys

Contestants
20 contestants competed for the title.

Crossovers and returnees 
Contestants who previously competed or will be competing at other beauty pageants:

National Pageants 

Miss Cambodia
2021: Sreykhouch Houn (2nd Runner-Up)
Miss Grand Cambodia
2020: Sokundavy Uch (as Siem Reap) (Unplaced) (Miss Popular Vote)
2021: Sreyleak Pok (as Prey Veng) (Top 10)
Miss Tourism Cambodia
2015: Manita Hang (Winner)
Miss Universe Cambodia
2019: Panha Chhoy (Top 10)
2021: Geklang Hun (Unplaced)
2021: Sreyleak Pok (Top 10)
2021: Sreypich Sary (Top 10)
Miss World Cambodia
2020: Sreyleak Pok (Unplaced)
Miss University Cambodia
2016: Sothnisay Heng (1st Runner-up)

International Pageants 

Miss Earth
2020: Nisay Heng (appointed) (Unplaced) (Winner - Talent (Sing Category) Asia / Oceania)

Miss Chinese World
2021: Panha Chhoy (appointed) (Unplaced) 

Miss Global
2019: Soriyan Hang (appointed) (Top 11)

Miss Tourism Metropolitan
2016: Manita Hang (2nd Runner-Up)

Miss World Peace
2022: Geklang Hun (TBA)
Miss Cosmopolitan World
2016: Sothnisay Heng (Unplaced)

References 

2022 beauty pageants
Cambodian awards
2022 in Cambodia